Hyperbaena jalcomulcensis is a species of plant in the family Menispermaceae. It is endemic to Mexico.  It is threatened by habitat loss.

References

Menispermaceae
Endemic flora of Mexico
Vulnerable plants
Taxonomy articles created by Polbot